is an anime children's television series produced by the Nippon Animation company from 1985 to 1986. The series consists of 130 10-minute episodes, distributed as 43 half-hour segments.

Synopsis
The show follows the adventures of a young boy named Ken, who has always dreamed of owning a car, and Bumpety Boo, a talking yellow car who hatched from an egg in the first episode, as they travel the world in search for Bumpety Boo's mother. Bumpety Boo, the fun-loving car, makes friends with Ken. Teaming up seems like a natural thing, but Bumpety Boo does not count on Ken's adventurous eight-year-old spirit.
Throughout the series, Professor Honky-Tonk tries to steal Bumpety Boo from Ken.

During their expedition, they have great adventures and help a lot of people they encounter on their way. They also encounter other talking cars. Bumpety Boo usually races them and always wins because of his strength and speed, which he receives after he smells flowers. In the end of the series the group finds his mother.

Regional releases
In 1989, Saban Entertainment had episodes of the show dubbed in English for North American audiences. In the early 1990s, Celebrity Home Entertainment's Just For Kids Division had these English dubbed episodes released on several VHS tapes. The show was aired for free on television in Australia in the mid 90s. The anime was dubbed to Arabic in Kuwait by end of 1980s and was called (bombo, بومبو).

Cast

Japanese cast
 Masako Nozawa - Bumboo
 Chika Sakamoto - Ken
 Kenichi Ogata - Dr. Monkey
 Yōko Asagami - Helena

English cast
 Julian Bailey - Ken
 Aimée Castle - Helena
 Brendan Stitchman
 Vlasta Vrána
 Dean Hagopian
 Rick Jones
 Pauline Little
 Matthew Mackay
 Ethan Tobman
 Jeremy Steinberg
 Elliott Mitmaker
 Walter Massey
 Bronwen Mantel
 A.J. Henderson

References

External links
 Official Nippon Animation Site (Japanese)
 

1985 anime television series debuts
Fictional cars
Nippon Animation
Television series by Saban Entertainment
Adventure anime and manga